Ramsgreave and Wilpshire is a railway station on the Ribble Valley Line that serves the villages/suburbs of Ramsgreave and Wilpshire, just north of Blackburn in Lancashire, England.

When the line was re opened in 1994 a new site had to be found, due to the construction of houses which blocked access to the old station. The platforms which served as the old Wilpshire Station (also known as "Wilpshire for Ribchester") can still be seen.

Facilities
The station is unstaffed, but has a ticket machine on the south platform, as of 2020. There are waiting shelters and customer help points on each platform; automatic announcements also provide real-time train running information. The ramps to both platforms have steps, so no step-free access is available.

Services
The station is operated by Northern Trains, and is served by a daily hourly service northbound to Clitheroe and southbound to Blackburn and Manchester Victoria, with extra trains during peak hours.

On Sundays in the summer, one or two trains operate from Preston or Blackpool North along the Ribble Valley Line via Clitheroe to Hellifield and onwards towards Carlisle. These also run in winter, but terminate at Hellifield, where connections for stations to Carlisle can be made.

References

External links 

Railway stations in Ribble Valley
DfT Category F2 stations
Railway stations in Great Britain opened in 1994
Northern franchise railway stations
1994 establishments in England